Anita Kanwar is an Indian film and television actor who is best known for her role as Lajjo ji in the 1980s Doordarshan mega soap opera Buniyaad.

An alumnus of the National School of Drama (1978 batch), Kanwar has also worked in films such as Mahesh Bhatt's Janam (1985), Mira Nair's Salaam Bombay! (1988), for which she was nominated for a Filmfare Best Supporting Actress Award and Thodasa Roomani Ho Jaayen.

In the 1990s, Kanwar took a long break from television and films before returning to play the character of Inspector KC, Chief of Homicide in the 1998 Star Plus crime series Saboot. In spite of garnering critical acclaim for her performances, she did not get roles of substance in films and was a victim of typecasting. "Such a tender, sensitive actress with the potential of Nargis! She finally ran away to Shimla," noted singer and actress Ila Arun said about Kanwar.

Kanwar lives in Gurgaon, near Delhi.

Filmography

Films
 Dostana (1980)
Aadharshila (1982)
Spandan (1982)
Mandi (1983)
Janam (1985)
Trikaal (1985) - Sylvia (Anna's mother)
Mati Manas (1986)
Sheela (1986)
Amrit (1986)
Kabhi Door Kabhi Paas Segment:Do Behna (Two Sisters) (1986–87)
Susman (1987)
Dacait (1987)
Razia (1988)
Om Dar-Ba-Dar (1988)
Tumare Sahare (1988)
Salaam Bombay! (1988)
Ek Din Achanak (1989) 
Bandook Dahej Ke Seeney Par (1989) 
 Reconnaissance (1990) *A Woman (1990) 
Thodasa Roomani Ho Jayen (1990)

Television

References

Further reading
'I'm too insecure to ask for work' July 1999 Rediff.com interview.
"I may never act again" January 1999 Indian Express interview
10 Questions: Anita Kanwar October 1998 Outlook interview

External links
 

Indian television actresses
Indian film actresses
National School of Drama alumni
Year of birth missing (living people)
Living people
20th-century Indian actresses
Actresses in Hindi television
Actresses in Hindi cinema
21st-century Indian actresses